Asphalt: Injection is a racing game for the PlayStation Vita and Android developed by Gameloft and released in 2011–2012. The eighth major game of Asphalt series. Just like Asphalt 3D, it was published by Konami in Japan and Ubisoft worldwide.

Gameplay
The game contains three main gameplay modes. The "Career" mode allows the player to unlock tracks, cars and upgrades. In "Free Play", the player can play with previously unlocked tracks and vehicles. The "Multiplayer" mode gives the player the ability to play against others online. The game includes 52 licensed cars, 20 career classes and 15 race tracks from the Android version of Asphalt 6: Adrenaline, similar to Asphalt 3D which has 17 tracks from the Android version of Asphalt 5. The Android version was released exclusively for Lenovo K860. It had two exclusive cars. They were unlicensed but resembled the Audi R8 and Ferrari Enzo.

Reception

The game received "generally unfavorable reviews" according to the review aggregation website Metacritic.  In Japan, Famitsu gave it a score of all four sevens for a total of 28 out of 40.

References

External links
 

2011 video games
Gameloft games
Konami games
Ubisoft games
Asphalt (series)
PlayStation Vita-only games
Multiplayer and single-player video games
PlayStation Vita games
Video games developed in France
Video games set in the Bahamas
Video games set in Brazil
Video games set in Cuba
Video games set in Detroit
Video games set in France
Video games set in Hong Kong
Video games set in Iceland
Video games set in Los Angeles
Video games set in Monaco
Video games set in Moscow
Video games set in New Orleans
Video games set in New York City
Video games set in Shanghai
Video games set in South Africa
Video games set in Tokyo